Glenn Palmer may refer to:

 Glenn Palmer (sheriff) (born 1961), sheriff of Grant County, Oregon
 Glenn Palmer (sprint canoer) (born 1945), British sprint canoer
 Glenn Palmer (political scientist), American political scientist